Fresh Cream may refer to:
Fresh Cream - The debut album by British blues-rock band Cream.
Crème fraîche - a dairy product of French origin.
 Fresh cream, made from milk